The name Chevrolet Greenbrier was used by Chevrolet for two vehicles. The first vehicles were a six to nine passenger window van version of the Corvair 95 van. The Corvair 95 series also included the Loadside pickup truck and Rampside pickup truck that featured a mid-body ramp on the right side. All used the Corvair powertrain in a truck body and were produced in the model years 1961 to 1965.

The Greenbrier name was used a second time from 1969 until 1972; for the mid-level Chevelle station wagon.



1961–1965 Corvair Greenbrier Sportswagon

Chevrolet introduced the Corvair lineup for the 1960 model year as the first of a series of generations of passenger compact cars. Chevrolet introduced a more utilitarian style of vehicle the following year under the model designation "Corvair 95". In appearance and design the vehicles were similar to the competing Volkswagen Transporter, which was essentially a bus-like adaptation of the Volkswagen Beetle that moved the driver over the front wheels (Forward control), also commonly defined as a cab over vehicle.

The air-cooled horizontally opposed Chevrolet Turbo-Air 6 engine was located in the rear of the vehicle under a slightly raised cargo floor. It was similar in principle to the 4-cylinder engine of the Volkswagen, but unusual for most contemporary cars. The  engine developed  at 4,400 rpm. Unlike the Corvair cars, the Corvair Greenbrier had a  wheelbase and were thus known as "95s." They came standard with a three-speed manual transmission but could be ordered with a two-speed Corvair Powerglide automatic transmission (distinct from the usual Powerglide); eventually a four-speed manual was also made available.

There were essentially two different bodies available in the 95 series: the van and the truck. The base version was the panel van (Corvan) with no side or rear windows. The van was named Greenbrier. The Greenbrier normally had windows all around and six doors, although an option was to have eight doors where there were opening double doors on both sides. The Greenbrier seated up to nine people with the available third-row seat. The 95s and cars had an optional heater using gasoline from the vehicle's tank. The Greenbrier also had a camper option.

A Corvair truck could be ordered as a "Loadside" or "Rampside". The Loadside was essentially a pickup truck with a standard tailgate. The Loadside was only produced two years and is the rarest of the Corvairs; production totaled 2,844 in 1961 and 369 in 1962. The Rampside had a side ramp to be used for loading and unloading cargo. These were used by the Bell Telephone Company because loading and unloading of cable drums was eased by the side ramp.

Ford and Chrysler introduced compact vans of their own (the Ford Econoline and Dodge A100), using a more conventional water-cooled engine mounted between the front seats. As these became successful, General Motors responded with its own design which placed the Chevy II sourced engine in a "doghouse" between and behind the front seats. The forward engine design allowed a flat rear floor with low deck heights in the rear of the van for loading/unloading cargo. General Motors stopped producing the truck versions of the Corvair in 1964 and the Greenbrier was the only remaining  wheelbase Corvair for 1965. Eventually, Chevrolet and Volkswagen would abandon rear-engined vans in favor of conventional or front-wheel-drive water-cooled engines.

Although the Greenbriers were a limited success, passenger vans would continue to evolve through full-sized vans. The similarly sized 7–8 passenger would become a successful vehicle segment by the 1980s as alternatives to station wagons.

1969–1972 Chevelle Greenbrier

During the 1969 model year, the four-door station wagons of the mid-sized Chevrolet Chevelle, produced since 1964, were renamed: the standard-trim station wagon known as the Chevelle 300 was renamed as the Nomad, while the medium-trim Chevelle 300 Deluxe was now called the Greenbrier. The top-of-the-line model, the Chevelle Malibu 135/136, became the Concours and Concours Estate Wagon, the latter being distinguished by exterior woodgrain paneling. Except for the simplest Nomad line (which was only available in a six-seater form), all station wagons could be ordered with either six or nine seats. Standard engine was the inline-six (not available for nine-seaters).

For 1970, the Chevelle 300 Deluxe series was simply called Chevelle and the inline-six engine was no longer available in the station wagons. In 1972 the series' model code was changed to 1C. The Nomad, Greenbrier, and Concours names were all dropped for 1973 when the Chevelle was redesigned and the wagons all began sharing series names with other body styles.

References

External links 
 

1960s cars
1970s cars
Cab over vehicles
Greenbrier
Mid-size cars
Motor vehicles manufactured in the United States
Rear-wheel-drive vehicles
Station wagons
Vans
Rear-engined vehicles